Bring Home the Revolution: The Case For a British Republic is a non-fiction book written by Jonathan Freedland and originally published in 1998 by Fourth Estate. Part travel book, part political and sociological examination of American society it is also a challenging argument for the introduction of Republicanism in Britain. The book was awarded the Somerset Maugham Award in 1999.

Synopsis
Journalist and broadcaster Jonathan Freedland takes a meandering tour through the stubbornly varied states and regions of the United States meeting people of all racial and cultural persuasions and of all religious and political beliefs in his effort to build an accurate picture of modern American society and the ways in which these people can and often do affect the way politics is carried out in their country, both locally and nationally. From these encounters Freedland learns the values of a republican government and how these values can be brought back across the Atlantic to Britain and benefit the very people who first created many elements of this republican ideology.

Reviews
'This is one of those rare books that compels you to rethink your world view from first foundations...Freedland is developing into the Orwell of our times. The book of the year.' Will Hutton.
'A Combative and meticulously thought-out tract for our times. Peter Conrad, The Observer 
'This spirited, intelligent book deserves to cause trouble. His enthusiasm is infectious because America has done for him what it does best; opened his mind.' George Walden, The Daily Telegraph

References

1998 non-fiction books
British travel books
Political books
Fourth Estate books